Cleburne is a city in and the county seat of Johnson County, Texas, United States. As of the 2010 census, its population was 29,337. The city is named in honor of Patrick Cleburne, a Confederate general. Lake Pat Cleburne, the reservoir that provides water to the city and surrounding area, is also named after him.

History 

Cleburne is Johnson County's third county seat (the first being Wardville, now under Lake Pat Cleburne). It was formerly known as Camp Henderson, a temporary Civil War outpost from which Johnson County soldiers would depart for war (most of them served under General Cleburne). The city was formally incorporated in 1871.

Cleburne was near the earliest road in the county. The location featured water from West Buffalo Creek, making it a stop for cattlemen from the Chisholm Trail.

In August 1886, the Texas Farmers' Alliance met at Lee's Academy and adopted a 17-point political resolution, commonly known as the Cleburne Demands, which was the first major document of the agrarian revolt occurring at the end of the late 19th century.

In 1900, Cleburne was the site of the founding convention of the Texas State Federation of Labor.

Cleburne was primarily an agricultural center and county seat until the Santa Fe Railroad opened a major facility there in 1898. During this time, the population boomed, as it became a sizable city for the area with over 12,000 residents by 1920. The Chicago, Texas and Mexican Central Railway connected Cleburne to Dallas in 1882. Two other railroads had terminals in Cleburne. The Dallas, Cleburne, and Southwestern Railway completed a route to Egan in 1902, and the Trinity and Brazos Valley, nicknamed the Boll Weevil, operated from Cleburne from 1904 to 1924.

Cleburne was the site of a prisoner-of-war camp for German soldiers during World War 2. The POWs worked as laborers on local farms.

In 1985, the city was the petitioner in the U.S. Supreme Court case City of Cleburne v. Cleburne Living Center, Inc. after being sued over a special-use permit.

Cleburne is on the fringe of the Dallas–Fort Worth metroplex. Growth in the area can be primarily attributed to suburbanization. It is the second-most populous city in Johnson County (slightly less populous than Burleson).

Tornado 
On May 15, 2013, Cleburne was hit by a powerful tornado that cut a mile-wide path through part of the city and damaged about 600 homes and two schools. No deaths or severe injuries were reported.

Geography
It is bordered to the north by Joshua and to the east by Keene. U.S. Route 67 runs through the north side of the city on a freeway bypass; the highway leads east  to Alvarado and west  to Stephenville. State Highways 171 and 174 run through the center of Cleburne on Main Street. Highway 171 leads northwest  to Cresson and southeast  to Hillsboro, while Highway 174 leads north  to Burleson and southwest  to Meridian.

East and West Buffalo Creek run through the center of Cleburne, flowing south to the Nolan River and part of the Brazos River watershed.

Demographics

As of the 2020 United States census, there were 31,352 people, 10,982 households, and 7,441 families residing in the city.

Attractions
The City of Cleburne Parks and Recreation Department maintains Splash Station, a small water park for people of all ages.

The  Cleburne Sports Complex contains seven baseball/softball fields, two football fields, and 20 soccer fields.

The Depot at Cleburne Station is a 1,750-seat baseball stadium, home to the Cleburne Railroaders of the American Association of Independent Professional Baseball.

Plaza Theatre Company is a 158-seat theatre-in-the-round, which operates year-round in Cleburne's historic downtown. The troupe provides family-friendly musicals and comedies, and has been the recipient of numerous awards for theatrical excellence since opening in November 2006.

The Johnson County Chisholm Trail Museum is an outdoor museum located in the western part of Cleburne at the site of Wardville, the original county seat of Johnson County, established in 1854. The original courthouse there is the oldest log courthouse in Texas. It has a one-room schoolhouse, a jail with the original iron doors from the Wardville jail, a blacksmith shop, an original mule barn, and a restored stagecoach from two early John Wayne movies. There is also the Big Bear Native American Museum. It was recently named as one of Texas' top 10 open-air museums.

Other local museums include the Cleburne Railroad Museum and the Layland Museum.

It has fishing in Cedar Lake, camping, swimming, and hiking trails.

Businesses
Major employers include Walmart, which maintains a Supercenter retail outlet and a distribution center. Together, those facilities employ 914 workers. The Cleburne Independent School District is a major employer with 968 employees. Local government is also a major employer, providing 348 jobs, and Johnson County has 598 employees in the city. Johns Manville, Texas Resources Harris Methodist Hospital, Greenbrier rail service (operating at the rail yards previously occupied by Burlington Northern Santa Fe), Supreme Corporation of Texas, and Broan-Nutone are among other major private-sector employers. A recent natural gas boom has now brought related companies to the district and surrounding areas.

Fun Town RV, the nation's largest single-location towable RV dealer employs 412 at its corporate headquarters and sales office.

Education
The city is served by the Cleburne Independent School District, with Cleburne High School as the only high school. The district also maintains an alternative school, the Team School, and Phoenix, which is the disciplinary school. The district operates two middle schools for grades 6 though 8: A.D. Wheat Middle School and Lowell Smith Middle School. Elementary-level schools serving the Cleburne area are Adams, Coleman, Cooke, Gerard, Irving, Marti. and Santa Fe (kindergarten through grade 5). A private school (Cleburne Christian Academy) serving age 4 through grade 12 is also available.

Hill College's Johnson County Campus is in Cleburne.

Cleburne High School sports
Cleburne High School is in UIL district 8-5A. Cleburne's most notable sports stadium, the Yellow Jacket Stadium is nicknamed "the Rock". It is primarily made of stone and was constructed by the Public Works Administration workers in 1934. Football and soccer are played on this field.

Cleburne High School fields teams in the following sports:
 Basketball, boys and girls
 Football
 Softball, girls
 Volleyball, girls
 Track, boys and girls
 Cross country, boys and girls
 Tennis, boys and girls
 Power lifting
 Soccer, boys and girls
 Baseball
 Swimming, boys and girls
 Golf, boys and girls

Cleburne High School has these arts programs:
 Marching band
 Concert band
 Jazz band
 Choir
 Drama
 Dance

Notable people 

 William H. Bledsoe, a member of both houses of Texas legislature from Lubbock, 1915 to 1929; co-author of bill establishing Texas Tech University, was born in Cleburne in 1869
 Johnny Carroll, a rockabilly singer, recorded for Sun Records, Decca Records, and Warner Bros
 Pat Culpepper, All-American linebacker for the University of Texas at Austin, was inducted into the Longhorn Hall of Honor in 1994 and to the Texas High School Football Hall of Fame in 2010, along with Drew Brees 
 Donnie Dacus, former guitarist for Chicago
 Dillon Gee, pitcher for the New York Mets, Minnesota Twins, and Texas Rangers
 Joe Keeble, football player
 David "Benedict" McWilliams, a former player and head football coach of the University of Texas at Austin and head coach at Texas Tech University, was raised in Cleburne
 Spike Owen, a former Major League Baseball shortstop 
 Derrell Palmer, a 1950s Cleveland Browns lineman
 Randy Rogers, singer and front man of Randy Rogers Band
 Del Sharbutt, radio and television announcer, songwriter, and composer of a popular Campbell's Soup jingle, was born in Cleburne
 Barbara Staff, co-chair of the 1976 Ronald Reagan presidential campaign in Texas, was born in Cleburne
Montey Stevenson, former professional football defensive tackle
Anne Stratton, composer
 Claude Porter White, composer

See also
The Greater Cleburne Carnegie Players

References

External links
 City of Cleburne official website
 History of Cleburne in the Handbook of Texas

 
Dallas–Fort Worth metroplex
Cities in Texas
Cities in Johnson County, Texas
County seats in Texas
Populated places established in 1867
1867 establishments in Texas